Fabrice Guy (born 30 December 1968 in Pontarlier, Doubs) is a former French nordic combined skier who competed during the 1990s. At the 1992 Winter Olympics in Albertville he won gold in the 15 km individual, then won a bronze in the 4 x 5 km team competition at the 1998 Winter Olympics in Nagano. He also has two medals from the FIS Nordic World Ski Championships with a silver medal in the 3 x 10 km team event in 1991 and a bronze medal in the 15 km individual event in 1997.

Guy also won the Nordic combined event at the 1992 Holmenkollen ski festival.

References

External links

 - click Vinnere for downloadable pdf file 

1968 births
Living people
People from Pontarlier
Nordic combined skiers at the 1988 Winter Olympics
Nordic combined skiers at the 1992 Winter Olympics
Nordic combined skiers at the 1994 Winter Olympics
Nordic combined skiers at the 1998 Winter Olympics
French male Nordic combined skiers
Holmenkollen Ski Festival winners
Olympic Nordic combined skiers of France
FIS Nordic Combined World Cup winners
Olympic medalists in Nordic combined
FIS Nordic World Ski Championships medalists in Nordic combined
Medalists at the 1998 Winter Olympics
Medalists at the 1992 Winter Olympics
Olympic gold medalists for France
Olympic bronze medalists for France
Sportspeople from Doubs